Eskild Bruun (12 October 1804 – 9 October 1877) was a Norwegian barrister, judge and businessman.

Personal life 
Bruun was born in Kristiansand on 12 October 1804, a son of merchant Arnt Bruun and Johanne Louise Askildsen. From 1836 he was married to Dorothea Marie Young, a daughter of wholesaler Jørgen Young. He died in Kristiania on 9 October 1877.

Career 
Bruun graduated as cand.jur. in 1828, and was barrister with access to work with the Supreme Court from 1835. He served as Attorney General of Norway from 1839 to 1842. In 1843 he was appointed judge in the Supreme Court. Also a businessman, he was co-founder of the commercial bank Den norske Creditbank in 1857, and chairman of the board until 1865.

Awards 
He was decorated Knight, First Class of the Order of St. Olav in 1855, and Commander in 1865.

References 

1804 births
1877 deaths
People from Kristiansand
19th-century Norwegian judges
Norwegian bankers